Syed Mujibur Rahaman (born 1 January 1974) is an Indian cricketer. He made his List A debut for Manipur in the 2018–19 Vijay Hazare Trophy on 30 September 2018. He made his first-class debut for Manipur in the 2018–19 Ranji Trophy on 28 November 2018.

References

External links
 

1974 births
Living people
Indian cricketers
Manipur cricketers
Place of birth missing (living people)
Wicket-keepers